The Mérida tapaculo (Scytalopus meridanus) is a species of bird in the family Rhinocryptidae. It is endemic to Venezuela.

Taxonomy and systematics

The Mérida tapaculo was previously considered a subspecies of brown-rumped tapaculo (Scytalopus latebricola) but was elevated to species rank based on differences in their vocalizations. Two subspecies are currently (2021) recognized, the nominate S. meridanus meridanus and the "Lara" S. m. fuscicauda. The latter was at one time classed as a subspecies of Magellanic tapaculo (S. magellanicus) and has also been considered a separate species, "Lara tapaculo". It might even be conspecific with S. a. meridanus and not a subspecies.

Description

The male's upper body is dark gray washed with brown; the rump and wings are brown. The throat, breast, and belly are paler gray and the flanks and crissum (the area around the cloaca) tawny with faint darker bars. The female is generally paler but the brown wash of the upper body is darker and the tawny flanks brighter. The juvenile is overall brown, darker above and lighter below, with barred underparts. The adult "Lara" subspecies has minor plumage differences from the nominate but they are thought to be age related.

Distribution and habitat

The Mérida tapaculo is found only in the Andes of Venezuela. The nominate subspecies is more southerly, in Mérida and Táchira States, while the "Lara" subspecies is north of it in Lara and Trujillo States. It inhabits the undergrowth and edges of humid montane forest. It is found in Chusquea bamboo but does not prefer it.

Behavior

Feeding

The Mérida tapaculo's diet and foraging phenology have not been studied.

Breeding

Little is known about the Mérida tapaculo's breeding phenology. Two nests of the "Lara" subspecies were globes made of moss, rootlets, and leaves. They were in crevices in a rock wall; one had one egg and the other two eggs. At both nests, both adults incubated the eggs until they were predated.

Vocalization

The Mérida tapaculo's song starts with a few descending notes and becomes a rising trill .

Status

The IUCN has assessed the Mérida tapaculo as being of Least Concern. Though its range is rather small and its population number is not known, it appears to be common with a stable population. Both subspecies occur in several protected areas.

References

Mérida tapaculo
Birds of the Venezuelan Andes
Mérida tapaculo
Taxonomy articles created by Polbot